The General Electric CF700 (military designation TF37) is an aft-fan turbofan development of the CJ610 turbojet. The fan blades are an extension of the low-pressure turbine blades.

Variants
CF700-2VThe 2B modified for continuous vertical operation on the Lunar Landing Research Vehicle (LLRV) and Lunar Landing Training Vehicle (LLTV)
TF37-GE-1 Military version of the CF700-2V

Applications
 Dassault Falcon 20
 North American Sabreliner Series 75A and 80
 Lunar Landing Research Vehicle/Lunar Landing Training Vehicle

Specifications (CF700)

See also

References

External links
 GE CF700 web page
 Cutaway CF700 Turbofan Engine Model AE-06-700
 Aft-fan CF700 cutaway

CF700
1960s turbofan engines
Medium-bypass turbofan engines